Langille Lake Water Aerodrome, formerly , was located adjacent to Mahone Bay, Nova Scotia, Canada and was open from April to December.

References

Registered aerodromes in Nova Scotia
Transport in Lunenburg County, Nova Scotia
Buildings and structures in Lunenburg County, Nova Scotia
Defunct seaplane bases in Nova Scotia